Symplocos lugubris is a species of plant in the family Symplocaceae. It is endemic to Peru.

References

Endemic flora of Peru
lugubris
Vulnerable plants
Taxonomy articles created by Polbot